Mold is the surname of:

 Arthur Mold (1863-1921), English cricketer
 Carlos Mold (1885-?), Argentine rugby union and cricket player
 Johnny Mold, America snowmobile racer
 Stephen Mold, elected Northamptonshire Police and Crime Commissioner in 2016

See also
 Mould (surname)